Elizabeth Raybould, OBE, FRCN (18 June 1926 – 3 May 2015) was an English nurse and nursing educator credited with helping to create a new organisational structure for nursing education in Northern Ireland, with a heavy emphasis on the development of nursing as a profession, and the preparation and training of safe practitioners.

Raybould was born in Walsall, West Midlands. She retired in 1983 from nursing and nurse education after some 25 years. She was named an Officer of the Order of the British Empire  for her services to the British healthcare system and in 1978 was made a Fellow of the Royal College of Nursing.

She died in Lymington, Hampshire in 2015.

Publications
 Co-author of Basic Nursing (1963)
 Co-author of A Guide to Medical and Surgical Nursing (1965)
 Co-author of A History of the General Nursing Council for England and Wales (1969)
 Editor: A Guide for Teachers of Nursing (1975)
 Editor: A Guide for Nurse Managers (1977)

Legacy
 Elizabeth Raybould Centre (Kent, England)

References

External links
 NHS website

1926 births
2015 deaths
People from Walsall
20th-century English educators
British non-fiction writers
British nursing administrators
Officers of the Order of the British Empire
Fellows of the Royal College of Nursing
British nurses